Will Evans may refer to:

 Will Evans (footballer, born 1991), English football defender
 Will Evans (footballer, born 1997), Welsh footballer
 Will Evans (rugby union) (born 1997), English rugby union flanker
 Will Evans (rugby league) (born 2001), Wales international rugby league player
 Will Evans (comedian) (1866–1931), English comedian, music hall performer, and maker of silent films

See also 
 William Evans (disambiguation)